On 5 March 2021, a Robinson R44 helicopter crashed in the outskirts of Xumabee near Sojwe in Botswana. There were at least two people in the four-seater helicopter: Sasa Klaas, a Motswana musician, who died at the scene; and Leonard Matenje, director for Air Technology Services, treasurer of Professional Hunters Association and the Botswana Wildlife Producers Association, who survived.

Aircraft 
The helicopter involved in the accident was a Robinson R44, with registration ZS-SBM. The helicopter was previously involved in a minor accident the resulted in the left skid collapsing. The cause of this accident was the result of a student performing an auto-rotation landing with decaying rotor RPM.

Investigation 

The Ministry of Transport and Communications released a statement stating the Directorate of Accident Investigation in the ministry and the Civil Aviation Authority of Botswana have started to investigate into the accident and currently the two agencies have not released any information. The result of the investigation is expected to be published in March 2022. According to unofficial sources, the cause of the accident was a result of the tail rotor hitting a tree while the aircraft was in a slight nose-up attitude.

See also 

 List of accidents and incidents involving helicopters
 List of fatalities from aviation accidents

References 

2021 in Botswana
Aviation accidents and incidents in Botswana
Aviation accidents and incidents in 2021
Accidents and incidents involving helicopters